The World of Fantasy is a 2021 Chinese streaming television series that premiered on iQiyi on January 9, 2021. It tells the story of A young man named Qin Lie possessing the Soul Suppressing Orb which held great secrets and unlocked his limitless potential. After countless close calls and many tense encounters, Qin Lie finally discovered the long hidden truth about his past.

 It is directed by Liang Guoguan and Jones and features an ensemble cast that includes Adam Fan, Cheng Xiao, Liu Yitong, and Nie Zihao.

The series was adapted from Ni Cang Tian's web fiction Spiritual Realm(灵域). 36 episodes are in Hindi also  globally available on iq.com.

Synopsis 
The amnesia boy Qin Lie (played by Adam Fan) is involved in a conspiracy due to an accident. After experiencing all kinds of hardships, together with his childhood sweetheart Ling Yushi (played by Cheng Xiao) and other friends, he gradually grows up in the spiritual realm and experiences the new journey.  On their way to find the truth about their life experience and pursue higher strength, this group of passionate young people, continue to meet life mentors and friends to protect the spiritual continent together.

Main cast 

 Adam Fan as Qin Lie/Gong Mulie
 Cheng Xiao as Ling Yushi/Wuchun
 Liu Yitong as Song Tingyu/Yexian'er
 Nie Zihao as Du Shaoyang
 Ma Yue as Xie Jingxuan/Tang Siqi

References 

2021 Chinese television series debuts
2021 Chinese television series endings
IQIYI original programming
Television shows based on Chinese novels
Chinese fantasy television series